Brown flycatcher may refer to:

 Southern shrikebill, a species of flycatcher found in New Caledonia and Vanuatu
 Asian brown flycatcher, a species of flycatcher found in southern and eastern Asia, and Indonesia

Birds by common name